The 2013 3 Hours of Silverstone was an auto racing event held at the Silverstone Circuit near Silverstone, England, on 12–13 April 2013.  The event was the opening round of the 2013 European Le Mans Series season, in a weekend shared with the FIA World Endurance Championship and the FIA European Formula 3 Championship.  Heavy rains during the race forced the event to be cut short, with only two and a quarter hours being run before Britons Simon Dolan and Oliver Turvey of Jota Sport were declared the winners.  Soheil Ayari and Anthony Pons led the LMPC category, Christian Ried, Gianluca Roda, and Nick Tandy won the LMGTE class, and Andrew Smith, Ollie Millroy, and Alisdair McCaig were the GTC class victors.

Qualifying

Qualifying result
Pole position winners in each class are marked in bold.

  - The No. 3 Greaves Motorsport Zytek-Nissan was moved to the back of the grid for not using the tires previously allocated for qualifying.

Race

Race result
Class winners in bold.  Cars failing to complete 70% of winner's distance marked as Not Classified (NC).

References

Silverstone
Silverstone
3 Hours of Silverston